The 1964 Friuli-Venezia Giulia regional election took place on 10 May 1964. It was the first election ever. Proportional representation was used.

Events
Christian Democracy was by far the largest party, largely ahead of the Italian Communist Party which came second. After the election Christian Democrat Alfredo Berzanti formed a government which included the Italian Democratic Socialist Party and, since 1966, also the Italian Socialist Party and the Italian Republican Party (organic Centre-left).

Results
Sources: Istituto Cattaneo and Cjargne Online

References

Elections in Friuli-Venezia Giulia
Friuli-Venezia Giulia regional election
Friuli-Venezia Giulia regional election